President's College may refer to:

President's College (Guyana), a school in Golden Grove, Guyana
President's College, Maharagama, a school in Maharagama, Sri Lanka
President's College, Minuwangoda, a school in Minuwangoda, Sri Lanka
President's College, Sri Jayawardenapura Kotte, a school in Sri Jayawardenapura Kotte, Sri Lanka